Gabanellia is an extinct genus of ray-finned fish from the Late Triassic.

References

 Feeding specializations in Late Triassic fishes

Prehistoric ray-finned fish genera
Prehistoric neopterygii
Triassic bony fish
Late Triassic fish
Fossils of Italy